Berezhany (Bzhezhani/Bzhizhani) is a city in Ternopil Raion, Ternopil Oblast (province) of western Ukraine. Berezhany hosts the administration of Berezhany urban hromada, one of the hromadas of Ukraine. Population:

History 
The first written mention of Berezhany dates from 1374, when the village was granted by the Governor of Galicia and Lodomeria Vladislaus II to Ruthenian boyar Vas'ko Teptukhovych. Shortly afterwards, in the 14th century it became a part of Poland and became the property of a noble family from Buchach — members House of Buczacki, later Sieniawa. As Mikołaj Sieniawski, a notable Polish military commander and politician envisioned a seat of his family there, on March 19, 1530, King Sigismund I of Poland granted the village a city charter modelled on the Magdeburg Law. The document, among other privileges, granted the new town of Brzeżany, as it was called prior to 1945, with: two markets yearly, one for the day of Our Lord's Ascension and the other for the day of Saint Peter in Chains, that are to be held every year. As to weekly fairs these are to be held every Friday, although with respect to the rights of other nearby towns. Thus, the town is to allow each and every tradesman, cart driver or businessman, regardless of his or her state, gender, faith or rite, to arrive to the town of Brzeżany for trade.

The town's location on the route between Lviv and Terebovlya proved beneficial to the city's growth and development. Among the first settlers to inhabit the town were people from Lwów liberated by Sieniawski from Tatar captivity. It soon started to attract settlers from all over Poland, including a large number of Jews, Ukrainians and Armenians. In 1534 Mikołaj Sieniawski also started to construct a large fortress at a steep hill on a small island at the Złota Lipa river (see Berezhany Castle). The stronghold was finished in 1554 and became the main seat of the Sieniawski family and one of the best fortified places in the region. Simultaneously, a large fortified convent and a church of the Bernardines was constructed on the hill nearby. Both fortified places provided a safe refuge for the tradesmen, which added to the city's prominence in trade and commerce. In the early 17th century one of Mikołaj Sieniawski's grandsons, also named Mikołaj, fortified the city itself. The fortress withstood all attacks by Tatars and Cossacks until the Khmelnytsky Uprising of 1648, when it was captured by the Cossacks. In 1655 during The Deluge, it was again captured by the forces of Sweden and the city was again plundered. However, it was rebuilt afterwards and withstood further Cossack attacks in 1667 and 1672.

In 1675 the town was again sacked and pillaged by the forces of the Ottoman Empire. However, Mikołaj Hieronim Sieniawski financed the reconstruction of the town. Among the buildings rebuilt were the Bernardine church and a Uniate church in the suburb of Polska Adamówka (paradoxically being primarily inhabited by Ukrainians and not Poles as the name suggests). Because of its relative safety the town grew and by the end of the 17th century there were nearly 8,000 inhabitants there. After the death of Adam Mikołaj Sieniawski, the last of his kin, the town was inherited by August Aleksander Czartoryski through Sieniawski's daughter Maria Zofia. Czartoryski, a notable magnate, created a large artificial lake in the town's proximity in the early 18th century. Along the bank of that lake, the suburbs of Siółko and Kastelówka were built. After the First Partition of Poland of 1772 the town was annexed by Austria, who attached it to the region of Galicia. After 1867 the town became part of the Austro-Hungarian Empire and continued to flourish as it was outside of the region of fortifications, inside which construction of new houses was severely limited. A grammar school was founded there in 1805, and had many notable alumni. Among them were Włodzimierz Bednarski, Franz Kokovsky, Bohdan Lepkyi, Rudolf Moch, Kornel Ujejski, Ruslan Shashkevych, and the future Marshal of Poland Edward Rydz-Śmigły. The town was connected by rail to Tarnopol (modern Ternopil, Ukraine) in 1894 and in 1900 it had a population of 10,610.

Although the city remained quite populous, with time it lost much of its importance as a trade centre and became populated primarily by Jews as a typical shtetl. Also, the castle fell into neglect as the successors of the Sieniawski family, the Czartoryski and Lubomirski families, were owners of many more castles and had no interest in this one in particular. During World War I the town was briefly occupied by Russia, but was soon recaptured by Austria-Hungary. The castle was partially pillaged by Austro-Hungarian soldiers who were stationed there during the war while some of the works of art were evacuated from the palaces of Puławy, Łańcut and Wilanów. At the end of the war the town was part of the short-lived West Ukrainian People's Republic, but in 1919 was awarded to the renascent Poland by the Conference of Ambassadors of the League of Nations, following the short Polish-Ukrainian War. During the Polish-Bolshevik War it was briefly occupied by the Red Army, but was soon recaptured by the Polish Army after the Battle of Warsaw. However, some of the most precious sculptures and paintings from the castle and local churches, evacuated to Kraków, were never returned and instead survived the war in the castle of Pieskowa Skała near Ojców.

After the Polish Defensive War of 1939 and the outbreak of World War II the town was briefly occupied by Nazi Germany, after which it was transferred to the Soviet Union. During the Soviet occupation many of the local inhabitants were sent to the Gulag camps; there was also a notable NKVD prison located in the town. In 1941, after the end of the Nazi-Soviet Alliance and the outbreak of the Russo-German War, the town was again occupied by Germany and attached to the so-called Distrikt Galizien of the General Government. Before World War II Brzezany's Jewish population was about 4,000, while after 1939 this population tripled with an additional 8,000 Jews, refugees from eastern German-occupied territories.  After the Soviets left in July 1941 (after murdering many Ukrainian civilians), the Ukrainians launched a pogrom, murdering dozens of the town's Jews, looting and injuring Jews. In December 1941, approximately 1,000 Jews were killed in the Lityatyn forest. On 12 June 1943 the Nazis murdered almost all the Jews from the Brzezany ghetto and work camp at the local cemetery; only a few escaped. Between 1942 and the end of the war there was heavy partisan activity in the area, mostly by local branches of the Armia Krajowa.

In 1944 the town was occupied in the course of Operation Tempest of the insurgent Polish Home Army, but the Polish nationalists were soon pushed aside as the town was occupied by the Red Army. In 1945 it was annexed by the Soviet Union and attached to the Ukrainian SSR. Since 1991 it has been a part of Ukraine.

Until 18 July 2020, Berezhany was designated as a city of oblast significance and served as the administrative center of Berezhany Raion though it did not belong to the raion. As part of the administrative reform of Ukraine, which reduced the number of raions of Ternopil Oblast to three, the city was merged into Ternopil Raion.

Climate

Education
There are four secondary schools and a grammar school in the city.

Economy
A brickyard, a furniture factory and a glassworks are all of economic importance to Berezhany.

Landmarks
Of architectural significance are the ruins of the five-cornered fortress (completed in 1554), a park originally laid out in the 17th century, and the wooden Church of Saint Nicholas (completed in 1691).

Nearby localities
 Shybalyn – c.  
 Narayiv – c. 
 Kozova – c. 
 Pidhaytsi – c. 
 Rohatyn – c. 
 Peremyshliany – 
 Burshtyn – c.
 Halych – c. 
 Ternopil – c. 
 Lviv – c. 
 Ivano-Frankivsk – c. 
 Zavaliv – c. 
 Zboriv – c.

People
 Markiyan Shashkevych (1811–1843) — Ukrainian poet, studied here
 Vassily Ivanchuk — world-class chess player, lived here
 Mykola Konrad — Ukrainian Greek-Catholic saint, beatified by John Paul II in 2001, taught here
 Aleksander Brückner — Polish scholar of Slavic languages and literatures, born here
 Antoni Brzeżańczyk — Polish football manager
 Zbigniew Dunin-Wasowicz — Polish soldier
 David Meir Frisch — rabbi, posek and rabbinical authority, lived here
 Edward Kofler — mathematician
 Samuel Hirsch Margulies — rabbi of Florence and the principal (from 1899) of Italy's only rabbinical seminary, born here
 Joseph Saul Nathansohn — Polish rabbi, posek and rabbinical authority, born here
 Shimon Redlich — historian, born here
 Edward Sucharda — Polish chemist and engineer, born here
 Edward Rydz-Śmigły — Commander-in-Chief of Polish Armed Forces, born here (in the village of Lapshyn on the outskirts of Berezhany)
 Sholom Mordechai Schwadron — Jewish gaon lived and died here
 Vitalii Skakun — soldier who sacrificed himself in the 2022 Russian invasion of Ukraine by blowing up a bridge, born here
 Volodymyr Sawchak (1911–2007) — painter and activist who lived in Australia, born here

References

Further reading

External links

 
 Gallery of old photos and postcards

 
Tarnopol Voivodeship
Ruthenian Voivodeship
Shtetls
Cities of district significance in Ukraine
Cities in Ternopil Oblast
Holocaust locations in Ukraine
Mass murder in 1941
Mass murder in 1943
Massacres committed by the Soviet Union
Soviet World War II crimes